Dato' Seri Dr. Ahmad Khan bin Nawab Khan (born 6 April 1933), known professionally as Ahmad Nawab, is a Malaysian composer. He has written over 2000 songs and has worked with artists including Tan Sri Datuk Amar Dr. P. Ramlee, Puan Sri Datin Amar Saloma, Uji Rashid, Datuk Sudirman Arshad, Salamiah Hassan, Datuk Andre Goh and M.Sani.

He became involved in the industry in Singapore and Malaya in the 1950s, 60s and then joined forces in the 1970s with Orkestra RTM for 17 years and received numerous awards.   Among the most notable awards is the Merak Kayangan Award [Best Song], the Bintang Malam (1980). The highest appreciation given by the Malaysian music industry to the senior composer is the Seniman Negara Award of 2006, on 20 November 2006. The award was granted by the Yang di-Pertuan Agong Tuanku Syed Sirajuddin Syed Putra Jamalullail during the Anugerah Seni Negara event in 2006, organised by the Ministry of Culture, Arts and Tourism Malaysia or KeKKWa (acronym in Malay language). He also received a RM60,000 cash prize and was appointed to become the official delegate of KeKKWa in national and international forums and seminars.

Dato' Seri Dr. Ahmad Nawab is generally known for his signature sunglasses and white suit and usually he will perform a saxophone solo.

References

External links
 Jabatan Kebudayaan Kesenian Negara
 Saluting Ahmad Nawab The Star
 Kakiseni.com Anugerah Seniman

1933 births
Living people
Malaysian people of Malay descent
Malaysian musicians
Malaysian people of Indian descent